The Norwegian Ministry of Labour and Sports was a government ministry during the German occupation of Norway.

The ministry was set up on 25 September 1940 by Reichskommissar Josef Terboven as a consequence of the occupation of Norway by Nazi Germany during World War II. The ministry was headed by Axel Heiberg Stang throughout the occupation. It was closed the same day as the occupation ended, on 8 May 1945.

References

Norway in World War II
Labour and Sports
1940 establishments in Norway
1945 disestablishments in Norway
Ministries established in 1940